The Men's pursuit event of the Biathlon World Championships 2013 was held on February 10, 2013. The fastest 60 athletes of the sprint competition participated over a course of 12.5 km.

Results
The race was started at 11:00.

References

Men's pursuit